Georgia Gwinnett College (Georgia Gwinnett or GGC) is a public college in Lawrenceville, Georgia. It is a member of the University System of Georgia. Georgia Gwinnett College opened on August 18, 2006. It has grown from its original 118 students in 2006 to approximately 12,000 students in 2019.

History

Beginnings 
The county purchased 160 acres of land located off Georgia 316 and Collins Hill Road in 1994 and designated it specifically for the development of a college campus. Five years later, the Georgia Legislature allocated nearly $20 million for the signature building which serves as the focal point on the campus today.

Site construction began in June 2000 to establish the Gwinnett University Center (GUC), a partnership among several state institutions. The board of regents approved a public-private venture to construct the first classroom building on the new campus. The new 120,000 square-foot building was constructed in 10 months.

In October 2004, the Georgia Board of Regents voted to create a new four-year college in Gwinnett County. The new college would inhabit the GUC campus and replace the four institutions then offering courses on the site.

The Georgia General Assembly passed legislation calling for the foundation of the college in March 2005. That same year, Gov. Perdue deferred a $5 million appropriation in the 2006 state budget for a 29,000 square-foot classroom building.

Daniel J. Kaufman was the college's first president. A month later, the Board voted to name the institution "Georgia Gwinnett College."

Before the end of the year, the board of regents approved several initial bachelor degree programs: Bachelor of Science with a major in biology, a Bachelor of Science with a major in psychology, a Bachelor of Science in education with a major in early childhood education (including eligibility for certification in special education), a Bachelor of Applied Science with a major in technology management, a Bachelor of Business Administration with a major in general business, a Bachelor of Science in radiologic technology, and a Bachelor of Science in nursing.

Georgia Gwinnett College opened on August 18, 2006. The college accepted 118 juniors as its first students. The following fall, GGC admitted its first freshman class. In 2008, the college held its inaugural commencement ceremony, graduating 17 students.

Georgia Gwinnett received accreditation from the Commission on Colleges of the Southern Association of Colleges and Schools in June 2009. GGC began offering majors in History, Exercise Science, Mathematics, Special Education, English, Political Science and Criminal Justice/Criminology.

Expansion and growth 
GGC opened a new Library and Learning Center as well as its first residence halls in 2010. The school had 5,300 students that fall. The GGC Student Center opened in January 2011 and a new laboratory building in August 2011. Enrollment reached 9,400 in the fall of 2012.

In early 2013, the college broke ground on its Allied Health and Sciences Building, future home of the School of Science and Technology and the School of Health Sciences and its nursing program, which began in the fall 2014 semester.

The Grizzlies began intercollegiate competition in the National Association of Intercollegiate Athletics in the 2012–2013 academic year.

On March 22, 2013, GGC President Daniel J. Kaufman was named as the new president of the Gwinnett Chamber of Commerce. Kaufman, who had been president of GGC since the institution's founding in 2005, stepped down from his role on June 30, 2013. University System of Georgia Chancellor Hank Huckaby announced that he had appointed Stanley "Stas" Preczewski, then-vice president for academic and student affairs at GGC, to serve as interim president. In May 2014, Chancellor Hank Huckaby announced that the Board of Regents approved his recommendation to name Preczewski, president of Georgia Gwinnett College.

For many years, GGC had controversial free speech zones. In July 2016, a college official stopped a student from distributing leaflets about his religious faith in an outdoor plaza. The student, Chike Uzuegbunam, was told he could only engage in this sort of activity by getting permission three days in advance and only at one of the two free speech zones on campus. After getting permission, Uzuegbunam was then told by campus police that he could not speak in the free speech zone because "someone complained". Uzuegbunam subsequently sued the college for violating his First Amendment rights. GGC subsequently changed its campus speech policy to make speech easier on campus and in 2018 a federal district court judge dismissed the case based on the change in policy. That ruling was upheld on appeal in 2019 but the student appealed to the US Supreme Court. The court ruled in his favor but the college had already changed its free-speech policy.

The college now enrolls more than 12,000 students.

Preczewski announced his retirement on January 10, 2019, effective the following day. Mary Beth Walker served as interim president with Jann Luciana Joseph becoming the college's permanent president on July 1, 2019.

Campus
The current campus consists of buildings A, B, C, H and W that are used for classes and activities. There are also a Wellness Center (Building F), Administration building (Building D), Athletics Complex (Building G), Student Center (Building E), the Daniel J. Kaufman Library & Learning Center, and several student residence buildings.

Academics
GGC is accredited by the Southern Association of Colleges and Schools (SACS) and has been so since June 25, 2009. In 2018, the college's business school earned Association to Advance Collegiate Schools of Business (AACSB) accreditation.

The college is classified as a Baccalaureate college.

GGC offers over 60+ programs of study including 20 majors. The college offers the following degrees:
 Bachelor of Arts
 Bachelor of Business Administration
 Bachelor of Integrative Studies
 Bachelor of Science
 Nexus Degree

There are teacher certification tracks in some programs for students interested in teaching at the secondary level.

Campus life
GGC has a diverse population of almost 13,000 students, with campus housing for more than 1,000. There are more than 160 student organizations and a very active student government association. There are 15 National Honor Society Chapters on campus. The campus has a 24/7 police and security force, and employs around 30 Student Patrols (who provide services that range from collecting lost and found to locking up buildings and providing courtesy escorts). The college's location near downtown Lawrenceville, and its convenient access to the big-city amenities of Atlanta and the many recreational opportunities in the Georgia mountains, make it attractive to a wide variety of students. GGC has the most diverse student body in the southern region, according to the U.S. News & World Report. The college enrolls students representing 32 states and 120 nations, as of fall 2018.

Organization
A new model in public higher education, Georgia Gwinnett College is an access institution built from the ground up to facilitate student success, its hallmark. It has achieved retention rates comparable to state universities. It also has a unique organizational structure that omits academic departments and other units typically found in higher education. Under the leadership of a president and cabinet, the college has several administrative divisions and schools, including:

 School of Business
 School of Education
 School of Health Sciences
 School of Liberal Arts
 School of Science and Technology

Faculty
The current student-to-faculty ratio for the college is 18:1, as of the 2018–2019 academic year. Faculty at Georgia Gwinnett College are not eligible for tenure, but are instead hired through renewable one- to five-year contracts. The college emphasizes faculty/student mentorship.

Athletics

The Georgia Gwinnett athletic teams are called the Grizzlies. The college is a member of the National Association of Intercollegiate Athletics (NAIA), primarily competing as an NAIA Independent within the Continental Athletic Conference since the 2012–13 academic year (when the school began its athletics program and joined the NAIA).

Georgia Gwinnett competes in six intercollegiate varsity sports: Men's sports include baseball, soccer and tennis; while women's sports include soccer, softball and tennis.

Facilities
The $13 million state-of-the-art Grizzly Athletic Complex opened in March 2013 and includes soccer, baseball and softball fields and an athletics building for team lockers, weight room, training areas, hospitality suites, academic resource space, coaches and athletic staff offices.

In July, 2013, the college acquired the former Collins Hill Tennis & Fitness Center which included 4 clay tennis courts and 12 asphalt tennis courts.

Accomplishments
The intercollegiate athletics program was begun from scratch, beginning in August 2011 when the Director of Athletics, Dr. Darin Wilson, was hired. From there the athletic program quickly ramped up. Highlights include:

 The athletic complex was approved by the Board of Regents in September 2011
 GGC athletics were accepted into NAIA in April 2012
 The athletics web site was launched in May 2012 (https://ggcathletics.com/)
 The coaches/staff were hired 
 The athletic complex opened in 3/9/ 2013
 Players were signed up for the teams
 Teams began competing in 2012–2013, depending on the sport.

GGC athletics have had a brief, but stellar history. As of July 2019, the GGC Athletic programs have captured 11 national championships, achieved over 1,000 victories and won more than 77 percent of their games during the past seven seasons of existence. In 2018, the Grizzlies advanced to the final site in all six NAIA national championship tournaments, and won men's and women's tennis national titles. Currently, each of GGC's teams are ranked in the NAIA Top 25 preseason or postseason polls. GGC is a past recipient of the NAIA Champions of Character team award. Several student-athletes have been recognized as All-Americans, Academic All-Americans and NAIA Scholar-Athletes, along with being named to the college's President's List and Director of Athletics' Honor Roll for their academic achievements. Coaches and the Athletics Director have continued to excel, winning titles and awards along the way. 

Highlights of these include:

 Dr. Wilson has earned numerous athletic director awards.
 Tennis coach Chase Hodges has been recognized as ITA NAIA Men's Tennis National  Coach of the Year five times.
 Men's soccer coaching staff named Region's NAIA Staff of the Year.
 Softball coach earns NFCA NAIA regional Honor.

Notable alumni 
 Jack Gurr, English footballer

References

External links 
 Official website
 Official athletics website

 
Education in Gwinnett County, Georgia
Universities and colleges accredited by the Southern Association of Colleges and Schools
Educational institutions established in 2005
Buildings and structures in Gwinnett County, Georgia
Nursing schools in Georgia (U.S. state)
2005 establishments in Georgia (U.S. state)